Daniel Lindström is the eponymous debut album of Swedish pop singer Daniel Lindström, released in 2004.

Track listing

Chart positions

Weekly charts

Year-end charts

References 

2004 debut albums
Daniel Lindström albums
RCA Records albums
Albums produced by RedOne